Dextronaut is the first album by the black metal band Velvet Cacoon, released in 2002 via peer-to-peer platforms. The band claims to have originally recorded and released the album in 1998, but this has been verified by SGL as a lie.

Dextronaut was re-mastered and re-released as a double disc set by Full Moon Productions in December 2006. The first disc does not include tracks 8 and 10. The second disc is three ambient tracks.

In 2010, Khrysanthoney released the album as it was originally made with no remastering and with all ten tracks included. This release did not include the second disc of ambient songs.

Track listing
All songs written by Velvet Cacoon.

 "Bloodletting" - 1:25
 "Infinite Plateau" - 3:26
 "Nest Of Hate" - 5:38
 "Perched On A Neverending Peak" - 7:08
 "Setting Off The Twilights" - 4:31
 "A Year Of Decembers" - 5:55
 "Reverie" - 3:27
 "Starlit Seas Of Angel Blood" - 4:21
 "World Untouched By Mankind" - 2:48
 "When The Purest Flesh Is Alive in a Heart Full of Hate" - 4:56

Disc Two (2006 CD re-release)

 "Velorum" - 22:27
 "Ambient Planet" - 29:04
 "Nighttime Ice Horizon" - 20:21

Personnel
Velvet Cacoon - All

Velvet Cacoon albums
2004 albums
Full Moon Productions albums